George Lewis Capwell Cronin (July 1, 1902 – January 7, 1970), the American manager of the Empresa Eléctrica del Ecuador ("Electric Company of Ecuador") in Guayaquil, Ecuador, founded Club Sport Emelec, a sports club, in 1929.  Emelec, named for the first syllable of each word in the company's name, is one of Ecuador's leading football clubs.

Biography
Capwell was born on July 1, 1902, in Olean, New York.  He was known for his love of athletics, particularly American football, basketball, swimming, and baseball.  When he was young, he lived for a time in Panama, where his father was an engineer involved in the construction of the Panama Canal.

He studied electrical engineering at Rensselaer Polytechnic Institute. After graduating, he took a job as an assistant engineer at a power plant in Cienfuegos, Cuba.  He later spent time in Panama.

Emelec

Capwell arrived in Guayaquil to work at Eléctrica on April 14, 1926. Soon after arriving, he founded a sports club, named for the first syllable of each word in the company's name: Emelec. He boxed and played basketball at the guard position; he organized basketball competitions at the company in 1927. He played the catcher's position in baseball games.  Potential members of the boxing club had to perform well in a fight against one of the club's experienced boxers in order to gain membership.

Capwell was not particularly interested in association football, but a request from the employees lead him to found a team, particularly since the workers were not particularly enthusiastic about Emelec's other sports.

The football team, composed solely of Eléctrica workers, was founded on April 28, 1929. On September 17, 1929, the team—with Capwell on the field—defeated Vanguard 14-12 at a tournament in Guayaquil. It won its first title, a local league made up of business-backed teams in Guayaquil, in 1933.

Emelec became Ecuador's first national football champions in 1957, and  they have won 14 national titles.

Emelec currently plays in the Estadio George Capwell, built in 1945 in Guayaquil. Capwell played in the first game staged in the stadium, a baseball match against Oriente.

References

1902 births
1970 deaths
American expatriates in Ecuador
American sports businesspeople
People from Olean, New York
Rensselaer Polytechnic Institute alumni
20th-century American businesspeople